Kobiana (Cobiana) or Buy (Uboi) is a Senegambian language spoken in several villages of Senegal and Guinea-Bissau. The language is referred to as gu-boy by its speakers. Speakers are shifting to Mandinka.

References

Senegambian languages
Languages of Senegal
Languages of Guinea-Bissau